The 2022–23 Israeli Premier League, also known as Ligat ONE ZERO for sponsorship reasons, is the 24th season since its introduction in 1999 and the 81st season of top-tier football in Israel.

Teams
A total of fourteen teams are competing in the league, including twelve sides from the 2021–22 season and two promoted teams from the 2021–22 Liga Leumit.

Maccabi Bnei Reineh and Sektzia Ness Ziona were promoted from the 2021–22 Liga Leumit. Maccabi Bnei Reineh was promoted for the first time in its history, Sektzia Ness Ziona returned after two seasons in the second league.

Hapoel Nof HaGalil and Maccabi Petah Tikva were relegated to the 2022–23 Liga Leumit after finishing the 2021–22 Israeli Premier League in the bottom two places.

Members of the 2022–23 season

Stadiums and locations

Personnel and sponsorship

Managerial changes

Foreign players
The number of foreign players were restricted to six per team, while only five could have been registered to a game.In bold: Players that have been capped for their national team.

Regular season

Regular season table

Regular season results

Championship round
Key numbers for pairing determination (number marks position after 26 games)

Championship round table

Results by round
The table lists the results of teams in each round.

Positions by round

Relegation round
Key numbers for pairing determination (number marks position after 26 games)

Relegation round table

Results by round

Season statistics

Top scorers

Top assists

Hat-tricks

(4) - Scored 4 goals

Discipline

Player
 Most yellow cards: 10
 Hélder Lopes (Hapoel Be'er Sheva)
 Hassan Hilo (Bnei Sakhnin)
 Diya Lababidi (Hapoel Hadera)

 Most red cards: 2
 Tamir Glazer (Hapoel Haifa)
 Philip Ipole (Hapoel Hadera)
 Beram Kayal (Bnei Sakhnin)
 Ihab Ganaem (Bnei Sakhnin)

Club
 Most yellow cards: 73
Hapoel Hadera

 Most red cards: 7
Hapoel Haifa
Sektzia Ness Ziona

Average attendances

Notes

References

Israeli Premier League seasons
2022–23 in Israeli football leagues
Israel
Israel